Open-source software Urdu localization was initiated by the Center for Research in Urdu Language Processing (CRULP) at the National University of Computer and Emerging Sciences, through its PAN Localization Project, funded by IDRC in Canada.

The localization of the following open source software is in progress:
 SeaMonkey – an Internet suite
 OpenOffice.org – an office suite
 Psi – a chat client
 NVu – a web development tool
 Drupal – a content management system

SeaMonkey Urdu localization
SeaMonkey is an open-source, multi-platform, complete Internet suite including a browser, an email client, an IRC chat client and a simple HTML editor. It is available in a number of languages and the SeaMonkey Urdu localization is under progress at CRULP. The localization of the SeaMonkey browser, email client and HTML editor is complete and is available in the form of an Urdu language pack. Translation of SeaMonkey help files is in progress.

External links
 Center for Research in Urdu Language Processing
 PAN Localization Project
 IDRC, Canada
 SeaMonkey Localized Language Packs

Free software projects
Urdu-language computing
Internationalization and localization